The 2008 Patriot League baseball tournament was held on consecutive weekends with the semifinals held May 10–11 and the finals May 16–17, 2008 to determine the champion of the Patriot League for baseball for the 2008 NCAA Division I baseball season.  The event matched the top four finishers of the six team league in a double-elimination tournament.  Fourth seeded  won their fourth championship and claimed the Patriot's automatic bid to the 2008 NCAA Division I baseball tournament.  Jason Buursma of Bucknell was named Tournament Most Valuable Player.

Format and seeding
The top four finishers from the regular season were seeded one through four, with the top seed hosting the fourth seed and second seed hosting the third. The visiting team was designated as the home team in the second game of each series.  Army hosted Bucknell while Holy Cross visited Navy.

Results

All-Tournament Team

References

Tournament
Patriot League Baseball Tournament
Patriot League baseball tournament
Patriot League baseball tournament